The Alliance for Solidarity in Mali–Convergence of Patriotic Forces (ASMA-CFP) is a political party in Mali led by Soumeylou Boubèye Maïga.

History
The party was officially registered on 10 June 2013. In the 2013 parliamentary elections it won three seats in the National Assembly, being the most voted-for party in Gao, Bankass and Macina.

References

Political parties in Mali
Political parties established in 2013